Gary Cahill (born 23 April 1968) is an Irish retired hurler who played as a right wing-back for the Offaly senior team.

Born in Birr, County Offaly, Cahill first played competitive hurling in his youth. He first came to prominence on the inter-county scene when he first linked up with the Offaly minor team, before later joining the under-21 side. He made his senior debut during the 1988-89 National League and immediately became a regular member of the team.

At club level Cahill is a four-time All-Ireland medallist with Birr. In addition to this he also won six Leinster medals and eight championship medals.

His retirement came following the conclusion of the 1997 championship.

Cahill's brother, Adrian, also enjoyed an inter-county career with Offaly.

Honours

Team

Birr
All-Ireland Senior Club Hurling Championship (2): 1995, 1998
Leinster Senior Club Hurling Championship (6): 1991, 1994, 1997, 1999, 2001, 2002
Offaly Senior Club Hurling Championship (8): 1991, 1994, 1997, 1999, 2000, 2001, 2002, 2003

Offaly
Leinster Under-21 Hurling Championship (1): 1989
All-Ireland Minor Hurling Championship (1): 1986
Leinster Minor Hurling Championship (1): 1986

References

1968 births
Living people
Birr hurlers
Offaly inter-county hurlers